Carreg Cennan is a Site of Special Scientific Interest (SSSI) in Carmarthenshire,  Wales (Grid reference SN670191). The site consists of a  strip of land surrounding a line of carboniferous limestone cliffs.

The site includes the spectacular limestone cliffs topped by Carreg Cennen Castle, as well as broadleaved woodland and limestone grassland.

See also
List of Sites of Special Scientific Interest in Carmarthenshire

References

External links
 Countryside Council for Wales: Carreg Cennan

Sites of Special Scientific Interest in Carmarthen & Dinefwr